Joanna Troutman also Johanna Troutman (19 February 1818 – 23 July 1879) sewed a flag for a battalion of Georgia volunteers who were leaving to fight in the Texas Revolution, which became known as the Troutman flag, consisting of a five-pointed blue star and the words "Liberty or Death" on a white silk field. On the reverse side was the Latin phrase UBI LIBERTAS HABITAT, IBI NOSTRA PATRIA EST which means "Where liberty dwells, there is our fatherland". On 8 January 1836 the flag was raised at Velasco which is now part of modern Freeport, Texas. The original flag was badly damaged by accident and only shreds flew in battle.

Background
The Georgians, who were led by William Ward, suffered a harsh fate. Though they escaped the Battle of Coleto and the capitulation of James W. Fannin's command, they were pursued by José de Urrea's cavalry. Out of ammunition, they finally surrendered and were marched back to Goliad to join the rest of Fannin's captured troops. On 27 March 1836 they were nearly all executed in the Goliad massacre.

Life
Born in Crawford County, Georgia on 19 February 1818, Troutman was the daughter of Hiram Bainbridge Troutman. In 1839 she married Solomom L. Pope and moved to a plantation in Knoxville, Georgia called Elmwood. The couple had four sons. Her husband died in 1872 and in 1875 she wed W. G. Vinson, who served in the Georgia state legislature. She died on 23 July 1879 at Elmwood and was buried next to her first husband. At the request of Texas governor Oscar Branch Colquitt her remains were transferred to the Texas State Cemetery in Austin in 1913. Her portrait hangs in one of the legislative chambers of the Texas Capitol.

Notes

References
Texas State Historical Association tshaonline.org Troutman, Joanna
Texas State Historical Association tshaonline.org Ward, William

People from Baldwin County, Georgia
People of the Texas Revolution
Burials at Texas State Cemetery
1818 births
1879 deaths
People from Crawford County, Georgia
People from Freeport, Texas